Eiko is a feminine Japanese given name. Eikō, also spelled Eikou or Eikoh, is a masculine Japanese given name. The meanings of these names depend on the kanji used to write them.

Kanji
In the feminine name Eiko, "ko" is generally written with a kanji meaning "child", while "Ei" may be written in a wide variety of ways with either a single kanji read "ei" or two kanji read "e" and "i", including:
 (first kanji meaning "eternity")
 (first kanji meaning "glory" or "honour")
 (first kanji meaning "flower" or "outstanding")
 (first kanji meaning "lustre" or "crystal")
 (first kanji meaning "river", second meaning "power")

In the masculine name Eikō, both "Ei" and "kō" may be written with many different kanji, including:
 ("outstanding", "duke")
 ("glory", "light")

People
Notable people with the name Eiko include:
, Japanese actress
, Japanese former freestyle swimmer
, Japanese gymnast
, Japanese voice actress
, Japanese historian
, Japanese singer-songwriter 
, Japanese art director, costume and graphic designer
, Japanese author of children's literature
, Japanese goalball player
, Japanese handball player 
, Japanese politician 
, Japanese actress
, Japanese beach volleyball player
, Japanese voice actress
, Japanese actress
, Japanese dancer
, Japanese skeleton racer
Eiko Otake (born 1948), Japanese artist, member of the performing duo Eiko & Koma
, Japanese actress
, Japanese enka singer
, Japanese pop singer
, Japanese former swimmer 
, Japanese businesswoman who founded animation studio STUDIO4°C in 1989 
, Japanese swimmer
, Japanese actress
, Japanese photographer
, Japanese actress

Notable people with the name Eikō include:
, Japanese business executive
, Japanese photographer and filmmaker
, Japanese comedian and singer
, Japanese politician

Fictional characters
Eiko Carol, a character in the video game Final Fantasy IX
Eiko Aizawa, a character in the manga and anime Shinryaku! Ika Musume
 Eiko Tokura in manga and anime "Slow Start"
 Eiko Magami in Project A-ko 

Eiko is also an Estonian male given name.

See also
Young-ja, Korean female name written with the same characters

References 

Estonian masculine given names
Japanese feminine given names
Japanese masculine given names